Batesiata tesserula is a species of longhorn beetle in the Lepturinae subfamily. It was described by Toussaint de Charpentier in 1825 and is found in Albania, Bulgaria, Czech Republic, Greece, Iran, Montenegro, Poland, Romania, Serbia, Slovakia, Turkey, and Ukraine. The females have much smaller prothorax than males. The species are black coloured with orange wings, that have a black dot on each of them. This is the only way to distinguish it from Brachyleptura fulva.

References

Lepturinae
Beetles described in 1825
Beetles of Asia
Beetles of Europe
Taxa named by Toussaint de Charpentier